Iceland was present at the Eurovision Song Contest 1986, held in Bergen, Norway. It was the first time Iceland was represented in the contest. While the country had satellite television contact from other nations (the United States and Canada) since 1981, Iceland was not able to connect to other European nations by satellite before the end of 1985, meaning that 1986 was the first year Iceland could send a delegation to the Eurovision Song Contest.

Background 
The Icelandic national broadcaster, Ríkisútvarpið (RÚV), confirmed their intentions to participate at the Eurovision Song Contest for the first time in 1986 on 26 October 1985. RÚV, which broadcast every Eurovision Song Contest from 1970 to 1985 in Iceland, announced that it would also organise the selection process for the nation's entry in addition to broadcasting further events within the nation. The broadcaster selected their debut entry in 1986 through the national selection show Söngvakeppnin.

Before Eurovision

Söngvakeppni Sjónvarpsins 1986 
Söngvakeppni Sjónvarpsins 1986 was the national final format developed by RÚV in order to select Iceland's entry for the Eurovision Song Contest 1986. The competition was held on 15 March 1986 at the RÚV Studios in Reykjavík, hosted by Jónas R. Jónsson and broadcast on RÚV and via radio on Ras 2.

Competing entries
On 5 December 1985, RÚV opened the submission period for interested songwriters to submit their entries until the deadline on 15 January 1986, however, deadline was later postponed until 25 January. 287 entries were submitted during submission period, from which, jury panel selected 10 songs for the contest. Ten competing artists and songs were revealed by the broadcaster on 7 March 1986. Following the announcement of the competing acts, it was revealed that two of the selected songs: "Vögguvísa" performed by Erna Gunnarsdóttir and "Ég lifi í draumi" performed by Björgvin Halldórsson, have violated the contest rules, which required the participating songs to be neither publicly performed nor released commercially before Eurovision final. For unknown reasons, aforementioned artists were still allowed to participate with ineligible songs.

Final
The final was held on 15 March 1986. The votes of a five-member jury decided the winner, although only the top five placings were announced. The winning entry was "Gleðibankinn", performed by Pálmi Gunnarsson and composed by Magnús Eiríksson. In addition to the performances of the competing entries, 1985 Eurovision winners Bobbysocks performed their winning song "La det swinge", and a new song entitled "Midnight Rocks" as special guests.

Artist change 
On 20 March 1986, RÚV announced that eventual Söngvakeppnin winner Pálmi Gunnarsson will perform "Gleðibankinn" at the Eurovision Song Contest as part of newly-created 3-member band ICY, alongside Helga Möller and fellow Söngvakeppnin 1986 participant Eiríkur Hauksson.

At Eurovision
The group performed sixth on the night of the contest, following United Kingdom and preceding the Netherlands. At the close of the voting it had received 19 points, placing 16th in a field of 20 competing countries. Iceland's first-ever points were awarded to them by the Netherlands (who gave the song five of the eventual 19 points).

The members of the Icelandic jury included Berglind Orradóttir, Davíð Scheving Thorsteinsson, Elsa Björnsdóttir, Guðjón Vigfússon, Guðlaug Þorsteinsdóttir, Karl Þorsteins, Margrét Stefánsdóttir, Ríkharður Ríkharðsson, Salóme Þorkelsdóttir, Sigurdór Sigurdórsson, and Svanhildur Kristjónsdóttir.

Voting

References

External links
Söngvakeppni Sjónvarpsins 1986 at RÚV.is 
Icelandic National Final 1986

1986
Countries in the Eurovision Song Contest 1986
Eurovision